Dichomeris bulawskii is a moth in the family Gelechiidae. It was described by Ponomarenko and Park in 1996. It is found in south-eastern Siberia.

The forewings are greyish brown with numerous small dark brown spots, including a small dark brown oblong spot near the base, as well as an oblique short streak along the cell. There is also a dark brown arched streak at the end of the cell, followed by a brownish patch. The hindwings are brownish grey.

Etymology
The species is named for Alexander Bulawsky.

References

Moths described in 1996
bulawskii